Alexandra Croitoru (born 1975) is a Romanian photographer whose work seeks to challenge accepted ideas of power sharing and gender in Romania.

Biography
Born in Bucharest, Croitoru studied from 1993 to 1998 in the Graphic Department at the National Academy of Arts. Since 1999, she has taught at the university's Photo-Video Department. In 2012, she participated in the artists' residency program at the 18th Street Arts Center in Los Angeles. In 2014, Croitoru got her PhD degree from National Academy of Arts in Bucharest. Her thesis focused on the "nationalization" of Brâncuși in Romania and was the base for her book published in 2015 in Romanian and translated in English in 2017,  Brâncuși. O Viață Veșnică (Brâncuși. An Afterlife).

Photography
Croitoru's work explores Romania's social and gender structures and examines the relationship between fact and fiction in documenting history. She is currently extending her work to cover transnational environments. Her approach began during her studies in the 1990s when she started to challenge power structures and gender as (in her own words) "the Academy was at the time an extremely patriarchal environment."

Recent exhibitions
In addition to many group exhibitions, Croitoru has presented her work at a number of solo exhibitions:

 2005: Documenting their Dream, Galeria Noua, Bucharest,
 2006 : Another Black Site (cu Ștefan Tiron), Galeria Plan B, Cluj
 2007: O lucrare despre muncă și un duel cu moartea, Centrul viitor de artă contemporană, Prague
 2007: O expoziție de fotografie, Galeria Andreiana Mihail, Bucharest
 2007: No Photo, Siemens_artLab, Vienna
 2009: A Fresco for Romania (cu Stefan Tiron), Plan B, Berlin
 2009: „RE-", Galleri Tom Christoffersen, Copenhagen 
 2012: The Cabbage Process, Galeria Plan B, Cluj
 2015: The Sons and Daughters of Brancusi. A Family Saga (Act I), Timisoara Art Encounters, Galeria Helios, Timișoara; (Act II), Galeria Plan B, Cluj
 2019: The Photographic Archive and history with a small h, Salonul de proiecte, Bucharest

Published books 

 2017 Brancusi: An Afterlife, ACBooks,

References

External links
Examples of Alexandra Coitoru's work from 18th Street Arts Center
Artist page on PlanB.ro

Photographers from Bucharest
1975 births
Romanian women photographers
Living people